Extensible Binary Meta Language (EBML) is a generalized file format for any kind of data, aiming to be a binary equivalent to XML. It provides a basic framework for storing data in XML-like tags. It was originally developed for the Matroska audio/video container format.

EBML is not extensible in the same way that XML is, as the XML schema (e.g., DTD) must be known in advance.

See also
Binary XML
WBXML
Matroska
WebM
XML
IFF, an older structured binary format widely adopted for multimedia

References

External links
The EBML website
The EBML specifications
RFC 8794

Markup languages
Computer file formats